Ezra Dwight Sanderson (25 September 1878 – 27 September 1944) was an American entomologist and sociologist who worked in the US Department of Agriculture on pest management in cotton before becoming a professor of sociology. He published two textbooks in entomology and wrote several books on rural sociology.

Sanderson was born in Clio, Michigan, and after graduating from Michigan State College went to Cornell, receiving a BS in agriculture in 1898. He then worked as an assistant state entomologist at Maryland Agricultural College, followed by a position as professor of entomology at Texas Agricultural and Mechanical College. From 1904 he worked as a professor of zoology at New Hampshire College and served as dean of the College of Agriculture in West Virginia from 1910. After working for many years in entomology, he studied sociology and became a professor of rural sociology in 1921 after receiving a doctorate from the University of Chicago. He served as the 32nd president of the American Sociological Society.

References

External links 
 Biography (Americal Sociological Association)
 A Bibliography of Ezra Dwight Sanderson, to September 25, 1943.
 Elementary Entomology (1912)
 A statistical study of the decrease in the Texas cotton crop due to the Mexican cotton boll weevil and the cotton acreage of Texas 1899-1904 inclusive. (1904) 
 Insect pests of farm, garden and orchard (1921)

American entomologists
Cornell University alumni
1878 births
1944 deaths
American sociologists
People from Clio, Michigan